Linda Nagata (born November 7, 1960, in San Diego, California) is a Hawaii-based American author of speculative fiction, science fiction, and fantasy novels, novellas, and short stories. Her novella Goddesses was the first online publication to win the Nebula Award. She frequently writes in the Nanopunk genre, which features nanotechnology and the integration of advanced computing with the human brain.

Life and career
Nagata was born in San Diego and moved with her family to Oahu, Hawai'i when she was ten years old. She earned a bachelor's degree in zoology from the University of Hawaiʻi at Mānoa before moving to the island of Maui, where she still lives with her family.

Nagata began writing after graduating from university, and published her first short story in 1987. She now publishes under her independent imprint, Mythic Island Press, LLC., which publishes e-books and trade paperbacks.  She is perhaps most recognized for her Nanotech Succession series, which is considered exemplary of the Nanopunk genre.

Bibliography

Novels
 The Nanotech Succession 
 Tech-Heaven (1995)
 The Bohr Maker (1995)
 Deception Well (1997)
 Vast (1998)
 Inverted Frontier
 Edges (2019)
 Silver (2019)
 Needle (2022)
 Limit of Vision (2001)
 Memory (2003)
 Skye Object 3270a (2011)
 Stories of the Puzzle Lands (as Trey Shiels)
 The Dread Hammer (2012)
 Hepen the Watcher (2012)
 The Red 
 The Red: First Light (2013)
 The Trials (2015)
 Going Dark (2015)
 The Last Good Man (2017)
 Pacific Storm (2020)
 The Wild Trilogy
 The Snow Chanter (2021)
 The Long War (2021)
 Days of Storm (2021)

Short fiction

Collections
 Goddesses and Other Stories (2011)
 Two Stories: Nahiku West & Nightside on Callisto (2013)
 Light and Shadow: Eight Short Stories (2016)

List of stories

Awards
 Locus Award for Best First Novel for The Bohr Maker, 1996.
 Nebula Award for Best Novella for Goddesses, 2000.

References

External links

Interview by Wayne Gerard Trotman, Red Moon Chronicle, August 2011
Linda Nagata interview at Locus magazine, November 2014

1960 births
Living people
20th-century American novelists
20th-century American short story writers
20th-century American women writers
21st-century American novelists
21st-century American short story writers
21st-century American women writers
American science fiction writers
American women novelists
American women short story writers
Asimov's Science Fiction people
Nebula Award winners
Women science fiction and fantasy writers
Writers from California
University of Hawaiʻi at Mānoa alumni
Novelists from Hawaii
People from Maui